Glendale is an unincorporated community in the town of Glendale, Monroe County, Wisconsin, United States.

History
A post office called Glendale was established in 1856, and remained in operation until it was discontinued in 1926. The name Glendale was selected by an early settler from a book he had read.

Notes

Unincorporated communities in Monroe County, Wisconsin
Unincorporated communities in Wisconsin